Flavius Plinta ( 418–438) was a Gothic politician and general of the Eastern Roman Empire. He held the title comes, and then became consul and magister militum praesentialis.

Biography 

In 418, as comes, he suppressed a revolt in Palestine, and it was perhaps in view of this success that the following year, in 419, he was promoted to consul posterior, concurrently with Monaxius, and Magister militum praesentialis. According to Sozomen, he was one of the most powerful figures at the court of Theodosius II.

Plinta was a Goth. He was related to Aspar, likely as his father-in-law, and father of Armatius. In 450 his daughter was given in marriage by Theodosius II to Constantius, the secretary of Attila.

In 431 he tried, unsuccessfully, to place Saturninus on the episcopal throne of Marcianopolis in place of the Nestorian Dorotheus. In 432 he advised the Bishop of Antioch, John, to accept the mediation of Theodosius II and to reconcile with the Patriarch of Alexandria, Cyril. Between 435 and 440 he asked the emperor to send him as ambassador, along with Flavius Dionysius, to Rugila, the King of the Huns. After Rugila died, Plinta and Epigenes were sent to his successor, Attila, with whom they negotiated and concluded the Treaty of Margus or the Peace of Horreum Margi.

Notes

Bibliography 
 Jones, Arnold Hugh Martin, John Robert Martindale, John Morris, The Prosopography of the Later Roman Empire, "Fl. Plinta", volume 2, Cambridge University Press, 1992, pp. 892–893.

 
 

5th-century Gothic people
5th-century Romans
5th-century Roman consuls
Gothic warriors
Imperial Roman consuls
Magistri militum